George Dee Jones (born December 31, 1973) is a former professional American football running back in the National Football League (NFL). He is currently Co-Hosting a show called “Football, Fatherhood, & Life”, with Troy Geary and founder of The Present Dad Foundation. 

Despite having a stellar college career at San Diego State, where Jones broke many of Marshall Faulk's rushing records, his pro career was shorten by injuries. He made his NFL debut during the 1997 season with the Pittsburgh Steelers, serving as a halfback for most of the season while Tim Lester was on injured reserve. The following season, he was released by the Steelers and moved on to the Jacksonville Jaguars before finishing his career with the expansion Cleveland Browns in 1999.

Before he joined the NFL, he bought a car, and then his parents bought him a plane ticket to Bakersfield, California to which he flew from Greenville, South Carolina.

Post-NFL career

Since his retirement from NFL in 1999 he had 3 children, one of which is with Down syndrome. The older one is eight years of and receives coaching in American football from George Jones himself. In an interview with PGH Sports Daily he said that "[NFL] was the greatest thing that ever happened to me".  He also started a podcast with his Co-Host, Troy Geary called, “Football, Fatherhood, & Life”. They talk to former NFL players and celebrities about the three pillars of their shows’ name.

References

1973 births
Living people
Sportspeople from Greenville, South Carolina
Players of American football from South Carolina
American football running backs
San Diego State Aztecs football players
Pittsburgh Steelers players
Jacksonville Jaguars players
Cleveland Browns players